Don Wilson Lock (July 27, 1936 – October 8, 2017) was an American professional baseball player and outfielder in the Major Leagues from 1962 to 1969 for the Washington Senators (1962–66), Philadelphia Phillies (1967–69), and Boston Red Sox (1969). A native of Wichita, Kansas, Lock attended Kingman High School in Kingman, Kansas and then attended what is now Wichita State University. He stood  (1.88 m) tall and weighed 202 pounds (92 kg), and threw and batted right-handed.

Lock signed with the New York Yankees in 1958 but never appeared in an MLB game for the Yanks. Instead, he was recalled from the Triple-A Richmond Virginians on July 11, 1962, and immediately traded to Washington for veteran first baseman and pinch hitter Dale Long. Lock played left field for Washington that season, but by early  he became the Senators' regular center fielder, supplanting the colorful Jimmy Piersall, who was traded to the New York Mets.

Lock led American League center fielders in put-outs, assists and double plays turned in 1963, and all AL outfielders in assists the following year. As a batter, he finished second in the league in strikeouts in both 1963 and 1964.

Overall, Lock appeared in 921 games over eight seasons, batting .238 with 122 home runs and 373 RBI. He managed in the Red Sox farm system for two seasons (1971–72, with the Winston-Salem Red Sox and Pawtucket Red Sox), and in part of 1973 for the Wilson Pennants, a co-op team in the Carolina League, after his playing career ended.

References

External links

Don Lock at SABR (Baseball BioProject)

1936 births
2017 deaths
American men's basketball players
Baseball players from Wichita, Kansas
Binghamton Triplets players
Boston Red Sox players
Fargo-Moorhead Twins players
Greensboro Yankees players
Louisville Colonels (minor league) players
Major League Baseball outfielders
Pawtucket Red Sox managers
People from Kingman County, Kansas
Philadelphia Phillies players
Richmond Virginians (minor league) players
Washington Senators (1961–1971) players
Wichita State Shockers baseball players
Wichita State Shockers men's basketball players